The Cairo Egyptians were a minor league baseball team from Cairo, Illinois, that played in the Kentucky–Illinois–Tennessee League (KITTY League) on and off from 1903 to 1948 and in the Central League in 1897.

Team history 
On February 7, 1897, the Cairo Egyptians, based in Cairo, Illinois, were formed as a charter member of the Class C Central League. Joining the Egyptions in the six-team league were the Evansville Brewers, Nashville Centennials, Paducah Little Colonels, Terre Haute Hottentots, and Washington Browns. Cairo's uniforms were gray and black. Severe financial problems throughout the circuit forced the league to disband on July 20. As of July 19, the final day of play, the Egyptians were in sixth place with a 30–39 (.435) record.

Another Egyptians team played in the first Kentucky–Illinois–Tennessee League (KITTY League) from 1903 to 1906 as the Egyptians (1903), Champions (1904), and Giants (1905–1906). It resurfaced as the Egyptians from 1911 to 1914 in the second KITTY League, then returned from 1922 to 1924 in another incarnation of the league.

For the final KITTY league, the team played from 1946 to 1950 before folding for good. In 1949 to 1950, they were a Brooklyn Dodgers affiliate known as the Cairo Dodgers.

References

External links
Cairo - Baseball Reference

Defunct minor league baseball teams
Defunct Central League (1897) teams
Cairo, Illinois
Baseball teams established in 1897
Sports clubs established in 1897
Baseball teams disestablished in 1948
1897 establishments in Illinois
1897 establishments in the United States
1903 establishments in Illinois
1948 disestablishments in Illinois
Defunct baseball teams in Illinois
Kentucky-Illinois-Tennessee League teams